Michael Diedrich is an American politician and attorney serving as a member of the South Dakota House of Representatives from the 34th district. Diedrich was appointed to the position in 2017 by Governor Dennis Daugaard, succeeding Craig Tieszen, who died in a boating accident on November 23, 2017. He assumed office on December 29, 2017.

Early life and education 
A native of Rapid City, South Dakota, Diedrich attended Rapid City Central High School. He earned a bachelor's degree from University of South Dakota, Juris Doctor from the University of South Dakota School of Law, Master of Public Administration from the John F. Kennedy School of Government, and Master of Laws in healthcare law from the Loyola University Chicago School of Law.

Career 
Diedrich served as a member of the South Dakota Senate from 1987 to 1991 and again from 1993 to 1995. Diedrich also worked in the Rapid City attorney's office and as the vice president of government relations for Regional Health (now Monument Health).

References 

Living people
Republican Party South Dakota state senators
Republican Party members of the South Dakota House of Representatives
People from Rapid City, South Dakota
University of South Dakota alumni
University of South Dakota School of Law alumni
Harvard Kennedy School alumni
Loyola University Chicago School of Law alumni
South Dakota lawyers
Year of birth missing (living people)
21st-century American politicians